Jaspur is a developing town and a municipal board in Udham Singh Nagar district in the Indian state of Uttarakhand.

Demographics
As of the 2001 India census, Jaspur had a population of 39,048. Males constituted 53% of the population and females 47%. According to 2011 India census, Jaspur has a population of 1,26,397. Male constituted 52.37% of the population and females 47.63%. Jaspur had an average literacy rate of 60%, higher than the national average of 59.5%: male literacy was 67%, and female literacy was 52%. In Jaspur, 17% of the population was under 6 years of age.  Hindi is the most common language here but some people also understand Punjabi language Urdu and English.

Geography
It has an average elevation of 320 metres (1050 feet). It is a small city, 45 km from Corbett National Park, Ramnagar and 210 km from New Delhi. It is 110 km from Nainital. It is the border town of Uttarakhand.

Transportation
It is well connected to all major cities of the states and region. NH-74 connects Haridwar in Uttranchal with Bareilly in Uttar Pradesh via Pilibhit. The total length of NH 74 is 333 km. It connects Jaspur to major cities like Haldwani, Kashipur, Gadarpur, Rudrapur, Kicha, Ramnagar, Haridwar and Dehradun. The town has its own local bus stand, while the government bus station lies on the outskirts of the city. The railway project is proposed to begin soon in the town connecting Kashipur to Dhampur via Jaspur.

Culture and People
The majority of the population is Hindu, Muslim, along with a smaller Sikh community.

Jaspur has a largely educated population. 
Dr Mohammad Azeem from Government Medical College Haldwani is a gem of Jaspur. Mr. Varun Goel of Jaspur was awarded the Wiedenfeld-Hoffman scholarship by the University of Oxford in May 2021.

Economy

Jaspur also known as wood city of India, it has a traditional wood mandi and some agro-processing industries. Many people in the city are self-employed and run shops, though the economy of the city is mainly based on agriculture. There is a sugar mill at Nandehi near the city, and many rice and paper mills in the vicinity of the city. The town has a number of hospitals. A number of businesses are well settled in the town such as automobile, clothings and garments, bookstores, jewellers, confectioneries, hardware stores, paint stores, Photography, sweet shops and restaurants.

Many new food and agro processing industries have come up in Jaspur, including Shri Ram Solvent Extractions and KOOK Frozen Foods.

Temples 
Temples include the historical Buddhist Monastery at the village of Bahadurpur, the Shri Thakur Mandir, which is also called Manokamna Mandir, having the great statues of Abhimantrit  Hanuman Ji along with Ram Parivar and Shri Radha Krishna Ji, and Bada Mandir. A Gayatri mata Mandir placed on the back of the indane gas agency . A Shiv Mandir also placed in Gopal Nagar, near Awas Vikas. Jaspur had an Mosque known as JAMA MASJID which is honour of the city

Population 
As per the Population Census 2011 data, following are some quick facts about Jaspur.

Population : 170,315, Sex Ratio : 911.

Caste-wise Population - Jaspur 

Religion-wise Population - Jaspur

Urban/Rural Population - Jaspur 
As per Census 2011, there are total 9,958 families under Jaspur Tehsil living in urban areas while 9,958 families are living within Rural areas. Thus around 34% of total population of Jaspur Tehsil lives in Urban areas while 66% lives under Rural areas. Population of children (0 - 6 years) in urban region is 8,121 while that in rural region is 15,781.

Working Population - Jaspur 
In Jaspur Tehsil out of total population, 61,916 were engaged in work activities. 74.4% of workers describe their work as Main Work (Employment or Earning more than 6 Months) while 25.6% were involved in Marginal activity providing livelihood for less than 6 months. Of 61,916 workers engaged in Main Work, 10,948 were cultivators (owner or co-owner) while 11,751 were Agricultural labourer.

References

Cities and towns in Udham Singh Nagar district